was a Japanese film director, screenwriter, and producer. He is best known for directing five entries in the Godzilla series starting with Ebirah, Horror of the Deep (1966) as well as the spy films Ironfinger (1965) and Golden Eyes (1968) starring Akira Takarada.

Selected filmography

References

External links
 

1923 births
2000 deaths
Japanese film directors
Deaths from lung cancer in Japan